Solms-laubachia is a high-altitude genus of perennial herbs in the family Brassicaceae. It is named for the German botanist Hermann zu Solms-Laubach.

Taxonomy
In 2008, Yue et al. expanded Solms-laubachia, using molecular phylogenetics, to incorporate all Desideria species and one other species, Phaeonychium jafrii. They also described four new species.

Distribution and habitat
Solms-laubachia species grow naturally in the Himalayan, Karakoram, Pamir and Hengduan mountains or, regionally, in an arc from Kyrgyzstan in the northwest to southeastern Tibet.

Species
Following their 2008 review, Yue et al. recognise 26 species:
 Solms-laubachia angustifolia  
 Solms-laubachia baiogoinensis 
 Solms-laubachia calcicola  
 Solms-laubachia eurycarpa  
 Solms-laubachia flabellata 
 Solms-laubachia grandiflora  
 Solms-laubachia haranensis 
 Solms-laubachia himalayensis 
 Solms-laubachia incana 
 Solms-laubachia jafrii  
 Solms-laubachia lanata  
 Solms-laubachia linearifolia  
 Solms-laubachia linearis 
 Solms-laubachia mieheorum 
 Solms-laubachia minor  
 Solms-laubachia mirabilis 
 Solms-laubachia nepalensis 
 Solms-laubachia platycarpa  
 Solms-laubachia prolifera  
 Solms-laubachia pulcherrima  
 Solms-laubachia pumila  
 Solms-laubachia retropilosa  
 Solms-laubachia stewartii 
 Solms-laubachia sunhangiana  
 Solms-laubachia xerophyta  
 Solms-laubachia zhongdianensis

References

Brassicaceae
Brassicaceae genera